The Flushing Avenue station is a local station on the BMT Jamaica Line of the New York City Subway. Located at the intersection of Flushing Avenue and Broadway in Bedford–Stuyvesant, Brooklyn, it is served by the J train at all times except weekdays in the peak direction and the M train at all times except late nights. The Z train skips this station when it operates.

History 
The Union Elevated Railroad, leased to the Brooklyn Elevated Railroad, opened an elevated line above Broadway from Gates Avenue northwest to Driggs Avenue in Williamsburg on June 25, 1888. As part of the new line, the Flushing Avenue station was opened. This was a branch of the existing Lexington Avenue Elevated, which then ended at Van Siclen Avenue; Broadway trains ran between Driggs and Van Siclen Avenues.

The MTA announced in December 2021 that it would install wide-aisle fare gates for disabled passengers at five subway stations, including Flushing Avenue, by mid-2022. The implementation of these fare gates was delayed; none of the wide-aisle fare gates had been installed by early 2023. Also in December 2021, the MTA awarded a contract for the replacement of the Flushing Avenue station's elevators, to be completed by late 2023 or early 2024.

Station layout

This elevated station has two side platforms and three tracks. The center track is used by the J and Z trains in the peak direction weekday midday and rush hours. Both platforms have beige windscreens with red canopies supported by green frames and support columns along the entire length. The station signs are in the standard black plate with white lettering.

The 2006 artwork here is called Migration by Robin Holder. It features stained glass windows on the platform windscreens and station house.

Exits
There are two sets of entrance/exits at the station. One is located at an elevated station house beneath the tracks, which has two staircases from either southern corners of Flushing Avenue and Broadway, token booth, turnstile bank, a waiting area that allows a free transfer between directions, and a single staircase to each platform at their extreme north end. Each staircase landing has an exit-only turnstile to allow passengers to exit the station without having to go through the station house. Three elevators were installed in Fall 2003 to make this station ADA accessible due to its proximity to Woodhull Hospital. One of them is at the southwest corner of Broadway and Flushing Avenue and goes up to the adjacent staircase balcony. The other two go up to the platforms from the staircase landing.

The other set of entrance/exit are stairs located at the south ends of each platform. These stairs lead to Fayette Street. There was formerly another station house at this end, but it was removed. These stairs were closed in the 1980s due to high crime, but were reopened in July 2017 to address potential capacity constraints from shuttle bus transfers due to reconstruction on the Myrtle Avenue Line and the 14th Street Tunnel.

References

External links 

 
 Station Reporter — J Train
 Station Reporter — M Train
 The Subway Nut — Flushing Avenue Pictures
 MTA's Arts For Transit — Flushing Avenue (BMT Jamaica Line)
 Flushing Avenue entrance from Google Maps Street View
 Platforms from Google Maps Street View

BMT Jamaica Line stations
1888 establishments in New York (state)
New York City Subway stations in Brooklyn
Railway stations in the United States opened in 1888
Williamsburg, Brooklyn
Bushwick, Brooklyn
Bedford–Stuyvesant, Brooklyn